Strongroom is a 1962 British crime drama film directed by Vernon Sewell and starring Derren Nesbitt, Colin Gordon and Ann Lynn. The screenplay concerns a group of criminals who lock two bank employees in a safe during a robbery.

Plot
Three small-time crooks, Griff, Len and Len's brother Alec, hold up a bank just after closing time on a Saturday preceding an Easter Monday bank holiday.

The stuffy bank manager (Mr Spencer) and his secretary, Rose are locked in the bank's airtight vault, or "Strongroom" by the crooks when two cleaners unexpectedly arrive. The robbers escape but realise that they face possible murder convictions as the bank will be closed for days and the two employees will suffocate. The crooks improvise a plan to leave the keys to the vault in a telephone box and alert the police by an anonymous phone call. Alec has this task. He is seen driving off but is killed in a road accident. Griff and Len receive a knock on the door from the police.  The news of Len's brother's death is given. Len panics at news of his brother's death but blames the two bank employees, vowing not to help Griff in helping to release them.

Meanwhile in the vault the two are calculating their length of air supply: a maximum of 12 hours if they conserve their breath... they will not live until Tuesday morning when the vault is opened. They hope someone will rescue them. However, the manager's friends, who he had agreed to meet up him at the bank, left when seeing his car gone and have started their round of golf without him. Rose's family believe her to be away (alone) for the weekend.

Len tries to retrieve his dead brother's belongings from the coroner's assistant but gets angry when told that the items, which include the strongroom keys, cannot be returned until the police give permission to do so. The duo decide to get hold of an oxyacetylene torch and try their best to break through to the suffocating bank workers (Griff having persuaded Len that, by not doing so, they're essentially putting their own necks on the block). In the meantime, having been contacted by the coroner's assistant, the police sergeant spots that the dead brother's belongings include a strongroom key, something a car-breaker shouldn't possess. The police track down the maker of the key and he advises them to which bank it belongs. The police initially suspect the bank manager of absconding, but it is pointed out that no bank employee should ever have both keys and therefore something is very amiss.

The police catch Len and Griff boring a hole in the strongroom door. When the boys explain that they're trying to free the workers trapped inside, reluctant at first, the Inspector agrees to let them continue. The duo get an air line through the door but their relief is shattered when, though the vault is opened and the bank manager taken out (barely alive), a police officer states "This one (Rose) is DEAD sir!" The look from Griff and Len sums up the impending doom for the pair, as murder was a capital offence at that time in the UK.

Cast
 Derren Nesbitt as Griff
 Colin Gordon as Mr. Spencer
 Ann Lynn as Rose Taylor
 Keith Faulkner as Len Warren
 W. Morgan Sheppard as Alec Warren
 Hilda Fenemore as Charlady
 Diana Chesney as Charlady
 Jack Stewart as Sergeant McIntyre
 Colin Rix as P.C. Harper
 Ian Colin as Creighton
 John Chappell as John Musgrove
 Pamela Conway as Secretary
 Colin Tapley as Haynes
 Kevin Stoney as Police Sergeant
 Duncan Lewis as Charlie (mortuary attendant)

Critical reception
The Radio Times wrote, "director Vernon Sewell sets up this improbable story quite neatly, but it's hardly breathless entertainment." TV Guide called it "a suspenseful, taut crime drama".

References

External links
 
 

1961 films
1961 crime drama films
British black-and-white films
British crime drama films
British heist films
Films about bank robbery
Films directed by Vernon Sewell
1960s heist films
1960s English-language films
1960s British films